Simone Osygus (born 30 September 1968 in Wuppertal, Nordrhein-Westfalen) is a former freestyle swimmer from Germany, who won two silver medals and two bronze medals at the Summer Olympics.

Together with Franziska van Almsick, Daniela Hunger and Manuela Stellmach, she won the bronze medal in the 4×100 metres freestyle relay at the 1992 Summer Olympics in Barcelona, Spain. She won also a bronze medal in the  same event   at the 1996 Summer Olympics in Atlanta, this time with Van Almsick, Sandra Völker and Antje Buschschulte. She also won two silver medals in the 4×200 metres freestyle relay and 4×100 medley relay races, although she swam only  in the heats.

See also
 List of German records in swimming

References

1968 births
Living people
Sportspeople from Wuppertal
German female swimmers
Olympic swimmers of Germany
Swimmers at the 1992 Summer Olympics
Swimmers at the 1996 Summer Olympics
Olympic silver medalists for Germany
Olympic bronze medalists for Germany
Olympic bronze medalists in swimming
German female freestyle swimmers
World Aquatics Championships medalists in swimming
Medalists at the FINA World Swimming Championships (25 m)
European Aquatics Championships medalists in swimming
Medalists at the 1996 Summer Olympics
Medalists at the 1992 Summer Olympics
Olympic silver medalists in swimming